Carlos Manuel Guedes dos Santos (born 31 March 1989) is a Portuguese former professional footballer who played mainly as a central defender but also as a left back.

Club career
Born in Barroselas, Viana do Castelo District, Santos spent the vast majority of his career in the lower leagues. In 2012, he signed with Boavista F.C. of the third division.

At the end of 2013–14, and due to the consequences of the Apito Dourado affair, the club was promoted straight into the Primeira Liga. He made his debut in the competition on 14 September 2014 at the age of 25, playing the full 90 minutes in a 1–0 home win against Académica de Coimbra, and finished his first season with two goals in 25 matches to help his team easily retain their league status.

In the summer of 2017, Santos left the Estádio do Bessa and had almost everything arranged with Aris Limassol FC, having even been presented. However, he left after the Cypriot First Division club tried to alter the contract's conditions without his knowledge, and joined S.C. Salgueiros in his country's third tier shortly after.

References

External links

Portuguese League profile 

1989 births
Living people
People from Viana do Castelo
Portuguese footballers
Association football defenders
Primeira Liga players
Segunda Divisão players
FC Porto players
Padroense F.C. players
Eléctrico F.C. players
Juventude Sport Clube players
S.C. Coimbrões players
Boavista F.C. players
S.C. Salgueiros players
AD Oliveirense players
Portugal youth international footballers
Sportspeople from Viana do Castelo District